Khandoba temple of Jejuri is a Hindu temple dedicated to the god Khandoba, located on a hill in the town of Jejuri, Maharashtra, India. It is one of the most prominent Hindu pilgrimage places of Maharashtra.

Jejuri's Khandoba is a clan-deity of many herding (Dhangar) and farming families of the Maharashtra and Deccan region.

History 
The worship of Khandoba began in the 12th to 13th century. The Khandoba temple was rebuilt during the reign of the Peshwas.

In 1737–1739, Chimaji Appa, brother of Peshwa Baji Rao I, gifted Portuguese church bells from Vasai to the temple. He and his Maratha soldiers took the bells from Portuguese churches as conquest memorabilia, after defeating them in the Battle of Vasai (1737).

Deity 

The central deity Khandoba, also called Malhari-Martand, Mallukhana, and Khanderaya, is one of the most popular deities of Maharashtra. Khandoba is regarded as a manifestation of the god Shiva.

Khandoba is the Kuladevata (ancestral tutelary deity) of many people of Maharashtra. The Dhangar tribe, herdsmen, shepherds, nomads, and farmers of Maharashtra worship Jejuri's Khandoba.

Legends
According to legend, two rakshasa brothers, Mani and Malla, pleased the god Brahma with their austerities. By Brahma's boon, they became very powerful and started destruction on Earth, harassing people. This led the God Shiva to arrive on earth in the avatar of Khandoba to destroy Mani and Malla. In a fierce battle, Khandoba killed one demon, and forgave the other when he promised to serve the common people.

Architecture 
The temple can be approached by three flights of steps from the east, the west, and the north. The northern steps lead to the main entrance of the temple. The temple is accessed by climbing nearly 200 steps. The steps have around 18 arches, 350 Deep-stambha (lamp-pillars) and several shrines bordering them. Around a third of the way up, the steps split and rejoin  higher. On one pathway going up, the pilgrims visit the shrine of Khandoba's minister, Hegadi Pradhan. The other pathway used by devotees going down, has the temple of Banai, Khandoba's second wife.

This temple looks like a hill fort, and is known as Jejuri gad.

In the courtyard is a brass-coated tortoise,  in diameter.

The temple is built in Hemadpanthi architecture style, consisting of an outer square hall and an inner sanctum. The sanctum includes a linga (symbol of Shiva) and three pairs of images of Khandoba with his first wife Mhalsa.

The temple also has a murti of Khandoba mounted on a horse in warrior form. Khandoba is worshipped with turmeric, belfruit leaves, and by offering naivedhya made from onions and other vegetables. The devotees offer flowers and turmeric to the deity. Devotees throw turmeric in the air as an offering to the god, and as a result the steps of the hill temple and premises have a yellow hue.

The temple is a Maharashtra state government protected site.

Literature
Jejuri (poem) by Arun Kolatkar was based on this village and its deity.
  Peshwekalin Jejuricha Itihas, a book authored by Raj Memane about the history of Jejuri during Peshwa time.

In the media 
 Some scenes of the 1957 film Naya Daur of Dilip Kumar directed by B. R. Chopra filmed in the premises of Khandoba temple and around its hill.
Jai Malhar, a Marathi mythological TV serial, was run on Zee Marathi narrated the legend of this temple's deity. Khandoba's character was played by Devdatta Nage.
Carry On Maratha film's Malhari Martand song was filmed at this Temple.

See also

 Shiva, Hindu deity
 Hindu religion
 Virbhadra, Avatar of lord Shiva
 List of State Protected Monuments in Maharashtra

References

Hindu temples in Maharashtra
Shiva temples in Maharashtra
Pune district